Kundrathur L. V. Vasantha (1923–2008) was an Indian actress, singer and dancer who worked mainly in Tamil language films.

Biography
Vasantha was born in 1923 in Kundrathur, then based in Ramanathapuram district. As a young girl, she was actively involved in singing and dancing. According to actress S. D. Subbulakshmi, Vasantha played in a minor, uncredited role in Pavalakkodi (1934). After becoming a teenager, she appeared in B. N. Rao's Rambaiyin Kaathal (1939), a box-office success that catapulted Vasantha into stardom. Rao later cast her in Bhooloka Ramba (1940), also a hit.

When Gemini Studios opened in 1941, Vasantha portrayed the lead female character in its debut production Madanakamarajan, financed by Gemini founder S. S. Vasan. The success of this film further enhanced Vasantha's reputation. When Vasan planned Chandralekha in 1943, he announced that Vasantha would star as the lead female, but she was eventually replaced by T. R. Rajakumari. Vasantha shifted to Salem where she joined T. R. Sundaram's Modern Theatres, and played the female lead in many of Sundaram's films such as Rajarajeswari (1944), Burma Rani (1945) and Sulochana (1947).

Vasantha was already an accomplished dancer and singer, so she did both in most of her films. Her dance-drama sequence in Madanakamarajan became notable. In 1946, she played the lead roles in two Modern Theatres films: the Wahab Kashmiri-directed Chitra which was not successful, and Subhadhra. After acting in a few more films, she returned to Chennai (then known as Madras) and lived there till her death in 2008.

Personal life 
Vasantha was separately married to producer K. K. Vasu, and Sundaram.

Partial filmography

References

1923 births
2008 deaths
Indian film actresses
Indian female dancers
Actresses in Tamil cinema
Indian women playback singers
Tamil playback singers
People from Ramanathapuram district
Singers from Tamil Nadu
Dancers from Tamil Nadu
20th-century Indian singers
20th-century Indian dancers
20th-century Indian actresses
20th-century Indian women singers
Women artists from Tamil Nadu